ACM Student Research Competition (abbreviated as ACM SRC or SRC) is an annual multi-tiered research presentation competition conducted by Association for Computing Machinery (ACM) and Microsoft.  The competition spans more than 20 major ACM conferences, hosting special poster sessions to showcase research at the undergraduate and graduate level. Selected semi-finalists add a slide presentation and compete for prizes in both undergraduate and graduate categories based on their knowledge, contribution, and quality of presentation.  Those taking first place at the second-level competitions are invited to compete in the annual Grand Finals. Three top students in each category are selected as winners each year, representing approximately the top 1-2% of competing students.

First-round conferences include International Conference on Computer Graphics and Interactive Techniques (SIGGRAPH), International Conference on Software Engineering (ICSE), Grace Hopper Celebration of Women in Computing, ACM SIGPLAN Conference on Programming Language Design and Implementation, and many others.

2016-2017 Grand Finals Winners 
2016-2017 Graduate Student Winners:
 Kazem Cheshmi, Rutgers University, International Symposium on Code Generation and Optimization (CGO) 2017.
 Omid Abari, Massachusetts Institute of Technology, Annual International Conference on Mobile Computing and Networking 2016
 Calvin Loncaric, University of Washington, ACM SIGSOFT FSE 2016

2016-2017 Undergraduate Student Winners:
 Victor Lanvin, École normale supérieure Paris-Saclay
 Jennifer Vaccaro, Olin College of Engineering
 Martin Kellogg, University of Washington

2015-2016 Grand Finals Winners 
2015-2016 Graduate Student Winners:
 Swarnendu Biswas, Ohio State University
 Thomas Degueule, French Institute for Research in Computer Science and Automation (INRIA), ACM Modularity 2015 Conference
 Christopher Theisen, North Carolina State University, ACM ESEC/FSE 2015 Conference

2015-2016 Undergraduate Student Winners:
 Jeevana Priya Inala, Massachusetts Institute of Technology

See also 
 Association for Computing Machinery
 Computer science
 Grace Hopper Celebration of Women in Computing
 List of computer science conferences
 Research

References

External links
 ACM Student Research Competition
 Association for Computing Machinery
 Institute of Electrical and Electronics Engineers
 Microsoft Research

Association for Computing Machinery
Student awards